Jerk, The Jerk, Jerks, or Jerking may refer to:

Arts and entertainment

Film, stage, and television
 Jerk (play), a 2008 puppet play by Dennis Cooper
 Jerk (TV series), a 2019 British sitcom
 The Jerk, a 1979 American film
 "Jerk", an episode of 2 Stupid Dogs
 "The Jerk", an episode of House
 "Jerk" (Space Ghost Coast to Coast), an episode of Space Ghost Coast to Coast

Music
 Jerk (band), an Australian metal band
 Jerk (album), by hHead, 1994
 "Jerk" (Kim Stockwood song), 1996
 "Jerk" (Oliver Tree song), 2020
 The Jerks, a Filipino rock band

Other uses
 Jerk (cooking), a style of cooking native to Jamaica
 Jerk (dance), a 1960s fad dance
 Half of the clean and jerk, an Olympic weightlifting lift
 Jerk (physics), an aspect of variable motion
 Jerkin', a dance

See also 
 Tim Jerks, Australian football coach
 Geomagnetic jerk
 Hypnic jerk, a kind of muscle twitch
 Soda jerk
 Jurk (disambiguation)
 Jerkin (disambiguation)
 Circle jerk (disambiguation)